A cotter is a pin or wedge passing through a hole to fix parts tightly together. In British usage cotter pin has the same meaning, but in the U.S. it means a split pin.

Typical applications are in fixing a crank to its crankshaft, as in a bicycle, and a piston rod to a crosshead, as in a steam engine. The angle of the wedge determines the position of the parts being held; therefore, on a bicycle, the pedal arms will only be at 180 degrees to each other if the angle of the cotter pin's wedge is the same on both pins.

Popular usage
Formerly, it was common to mount bicycle cranks using a cotter, although now usually a more easily maintained arrangement is used such as a square tapered or splined interface.  These cotters have a short threaded section at the narrower end of the taper, which is used to hold the cotter in place with a washer and nut. They are also used to secure ceiling fans to prevent falling if the mounting nut loosens.

See also

References

External links 
 Cottered Cranks by Sheldon Brown

Bicycle parts
Fasteners